Ann Blair Thornton  (born October 5, 1989) is a former American beauty pageant titleholder from Bowling Green, Kentucky who was named Miss Kentucky 2011.

Biography
Thornton won the title of Miss Kentucky on July 16, 2011, when she received her crown from outgoing titleholder Djuan Trent. Thornton's platform, Alzheimer's awareness and research, was inspired by her grandfather's own struggle with Alzheimer's disease. Her competition talent was a piano performance of Rachmaninoff's Prelude in G Minor. Thornton is majoring in English and economics at Western Kentucky University, where she is a sister of Chi Omega sorority. After graduation, she planned to attend law school and become an attorney which never came into fruition. She was named The Quality of Life Award Winner at the Miss America 2012 pageant. At the age of 17, Thornton won the title of Miss Kentucky's Outstanding Teen in 2007, and went on to compete in the Miss America's Outstanding Teen pageant in 2008, where she finished 4th runner-up and won the Troy Scholarship.

References

External links

 
 

1989 births
Living people
American beauty pageant winners
Beauty pageants in Kentucky
Miss America 2012 delegates
Miss Kentucky winners
People from Bowling Green, Kentucky
People from Dallas
Western Kentucky University alumni